San Teodoro (Gallurese: Santu Diadòru) is a comune (municipality) in the Province of Sassari in the Italian region Sardinia, located about  northeast of Cagliari and about  southeast of Olbia.

The municipality of San Teodoro contains several frazioni (subdivisions, mainly villages and hamlets), among which: La Suarédda, Monti Pitrosu, Straula, Budditogliu, La Traversa, Lu Fraili, and Lu Sitagliacciu.

San Teodoro borders the following municipalities: Budoni, Loiri Porto San Paolo, Padru, Torpè.

The beach of "La Cinta" was home of the kite boarding festival in September 2010.

The beach of "Lu Impostu" is also known as Little Tahiti due to the beautiful colours of the sea.

Demographic evolution

References

External links

 www.comune.san-teodoro.nu.it/
 
 San Teodoro little Guide

Cities and towns in Sardinia
1959 establishments in Italy
States and territories established in 1959